The Metal Gear video games consist of 17 different albums, totaling over 940 hours of music within the 11 games. There were four different music labels used for the albums in different games. These include Sony Entertainment, Konami Digital Entertainment, Phantom Studios, Sumthing Else Music Works, and King Records (Japan). The most used record labels were Konami Digital Entertainment and King Records. Konami was used for Metal Gear 20th Anniversary: Metal Gear Music Collection, Metal Gear Solid 4: Guns of the Patriots Original Soundtrack, Metal Gear Solid: Peace Walker Original Soundtrack, and the Metal Gear 25th Anniversary: Metal Gear Music Collection, Metal Gear Rising: Revengeance. King Records was used for Metal Gear 2: Solid Snake Original Soundtrack, Metal Gear Solid Original Game Soundtrack, Metal Gear/ Solid Snake: Music Compilation of Hideo Kojima / Red Dis, Metal Gear Solid 2: Sons of Liberty Original Soundtrack, and Metal Gear Solid 2: Sons of Liberty Soundtrack 2: The Other Side. Several different producers were used for different games. These include Konami, Masahiro Hinami, Noriakio Kamura, Norihiko Hibino, Tojima, Harry Gregson-Williams. Konami producing 6 out of the 11 Metal Gear games. The games used many different genres of music throughout the games. They are as follows: breakbeat, classical, drum and bass, electronic, hip hop, jazz, ambient, acoustic, Latin American, electronic rock, industrial metal, alternative metal, hard rock, power metal, neoclassical, romantic music, lounge, and rock and roll.

Albums

Metal Gear 2: Solid Snake Original Soundtrack

Metal Gear 2: Solid Snake Original Soundtrack is the official soundtrack to Konami's 1990 MSX2 video game Metal Gear 2: Solid Snake. The original music was composed by the Konami Kukeiha Club and the CD was released on April 5, 1991.

The soundtrack was re-released on September 23, 1998 as part of the 2-CD bundle titled Konami MSX Super Best Antiques, which also included the Gofer no Yabou Episode 2 and Space Manbow albums.

Arranged music based on Metal Gear 2: Solid Snake were used for the VR Training disc in Metal Gear Solid: Integral (which was released in North America as Metal Gear Solid: VR Missions). Additionally, Integral features two hidden tunes based on Metal Gear 2 available via a secret codec frequency in the main game. One is an arranged version of the "Theme of Solid Snake", while the other is an arrangement of "Zanzibar Breeze." "Theme of Solid Snake" made an appearance in Nintendo's crossover fighting game Super Smash Bros. Brawl on the Shadow Moses Island stage.

Metal Gear Solid Original Game Soundtrack

Metal Gear Solid Original Game Soundtrack is the official soundtrack to Konami's 1998 stealth game Metal Gear Solid. Most of the original music was composed and performed by the Konami Computer Entertainment (KCE) Sound Team Japan (comprising Takanari Ishiyama, Gigi Meroni, Kazuki Muraoka, Lee Jeon Myung and Hiroyuki Togo), with the exception of the "Metal Gear Solid Main Theme", composed by TAPPY, and "The Best Is Yet to Come", composed by Rika Muranaka and performed by Aoife Ní Fhearraigh. The CD was released on September 23, 1998 – three weeks after the Japanese release of the game.

A total of three versions of the soundtrack were released, with the "Metal Gear Solid Control Mix" track missing from the earliest version. Limited print editions of the Japanese copy and the standard European copy have cardboard sleeves accompanied with the discs jewel case. The final edition of the Japanese print does not come with the cardboard sleeve.

Music played in-game has a synthetic feel with increased pace and introduction of strings during tense moments, with a looping style endemic to video games. Overtly cinematic music, with stronger orchestral and choral elements, appears in cutscenes. The soundtrack was released on September 23, 1998, under the King Records label.

"The Best Is Yet to Come"
"The Best Is Yet to Come" was written in Japanese by Rika Muranaka and translated into Irish by Bláthnaid Ní Chofaigh. The song was recorded at Beech Park Studio, Ireland, engineered by Philip Begley and produced by Muranaka.

Personnel

Musicians
Aoife Ní Fhearraigh – lead vocals
Declan Masterson – low pipe, bouzouki
James Blennerhassett – double bass
John Fitzpatrick – fiddle
Noel Bridgeman – percussion
Rika Muranaka – keyboards, production

Additional personnel
Philip Begley – engineering
David Downes – additional choral arrangement

Chorus vocalists
Iarlaith Carter
Stephen Mailey
Eimear Noone
Meav Ní Mhaolchatha
John Mc Namara
Cathal Clinch
Rachel Talbot
Sinead Fay
Sylvia O'Brieniarlaith Carter
Ewan Cowley

Metal Gear / Solid Snake: Music Compilation of Hideo Kojima / Red Disc

 is a soundtrack album featuring remixed music based on the MSX2 video games Metal Gear and Metal Gear 2: Solid Snake. A companion album titled  was also released, which featured similarly remixed music based on Snatcher and Policenauts. Red Disc consists almost entirely of newly-remixed tracks, including two original tracks, plus three tracks recycled from the Metal Gear 2: Solid Snake original soundtrack album. The composers for Red Disc include Hikaru Nanase, Kanichiroo Kubo, Konami Kukeiha Club, Motoaki Furukawa and Yoshiyuki Itoo.

Metal Gear Solid 2: Sons of Liberty Original Soundtrack

Metal Gear Solid 2: Sons of Liberty Original Soundtrack is the official soundtrack to Konami's 2001 stealth game Metal Gear Solid 2: Sons of Liberty.

Most of the original music was composed and arranged by Harry Gregson-Williams, with the exceptions of "Metal Gear Solid Main Theme", composed by Tappi Iwase and arranged by Harry Gregson-Williams, "Can't Say Goodbye to Yesterday", written by Rika Muranaka and performed by the Felix Farrar Orchestra and (in the full version) Carla White, and "Fortune" and "Who Am I Really?", composed by Norihiko Hibino. "Opening Infiltration", "RAY Escapes", "The World Needs Only One Big Boss!" and "Arsenal Is Going to Take Off!" were co-composed by Gregson-Williams and Hibino.

The CD was released on November 29, 2001 – the same day as the Japanese release of the game. A second soundtrack to Sons of Liberty, Metal Gear Solid 2: Sons of Liberty Soundtrack 2: The Other Side, was released in 2002.

Metal Gear Solid 2: Sons of Liberty Soundtrack 2: The Other Side

Metal Gear Solid 2: Sons of Liberty Soundtrack 2: Other Side is the second official soundtrack to Konami's 2001 stealth game Metal Gear Solid 2: Sons of Liberty. All of the original music was composed by Norihiko Hibino. The CD was released on January 26, 2002 – two months after the Japanese release of the game.

Metal Gear Solid 2: Substance Original Soundtrack Ultimate Sorter Edition

Metal Gear Solid 2: Substance Original Soundtrack Ultimate Sorter Edition is a soundtrack included with special edition sorter for Metal Gear Solid 2: Substance. All tracks are composed by Harry Gregson-Williams & Norihiko Hibino.

Track listing

Metal Gear Solid 2: Substance Limited Soundtrack Ultimate Sorter Edition

Metal Gear Solid 2: Substance Limited Soundtrack Ultimate Sorter Edition is a soundtrack that came packaged with a special edition sorter of Metal Gear Solid 2: Substance. Music is composed by: Norihiko Hibino & TAPPY.

Track listing

Metal Gear Solid 3: Snake Eater Original Soundtrack

Metal Gear Solid 3: Snake Eater Original Soundtrack is the official soundtrack album of Konami's PlayStation 2 video game Metal Gear Solid 3: Snake Eater and was released by Japanese music label, Phantom, on December 17, 2004 under the catalog number KOLA-089/090. The soundtrack consists of two discs and features music from various artists and composers such as Harry Gregson-Williams, Norihiko Hibino, Cynthia Harrell, TAPPY, and Starsailor. The soundtrack also included a "Special Camouflage Key Disc" which allowed players who owned a copy of Metal Gear Solid 3: Snake Eater for the PlayStation 2 to obtain additional camouflage uniforms for Naked Snake by selecting "Special Camouflage Key" under the menu titled "Special" once it's prompted to appear in the game.

Track listing

Disc one 71:45
Special camouflage key disc.

Disc two 70:12

Soundtrack credits
 Executive Soundtrack Director – Hideo Kojima
 Music Supervisor – Kazuki Muraoka
 Mastered by Chiaki Ikematsu
 Art Director and Designer – Ichiro Kutome
 Illustration – Yoji Shinkawa
 Producer – Yuichi Hashimoto
 Co-Producer – Kazuki Aoki
 Executive Producer – Akihiko Nagata

Notes
 "Underground Tunnel" uses a sample from the Phone Booth soundtrack
 "Debriefing" uses a sample from the "Man on Fire" soundtrack.
 "Healing Tracks" are actually written by Norihiko Hibino, who selected song titles and artist names as a parody of the music in the '60s.
 "Snake Eater" sans the vocals and "Battle in the Base" appear in Super Smash Bros. Brawl for the Wii. Both of these tracks can be used alongside other classic Metal Gear Solid tracks as the background music for Solid Snake's Stage, "Shadow Moses Island".

Metal Gear Solid 3: Snake Eater – The First Bite

Metal Gear Solid 3: Snake Eater – The First Bite is a CD that was only released in Japan in November 2004. The CD includes promotional materials, such as songs, screensaver and a Snake Eater music video. Music is composed by Norihiko Hibino.

Metal Gear Acid 1 & 2 Original Soundtrack

Metal Gear Acid 1 & 2 Original Soundtrack is a double CD album released on December 21, 2005. The first disc includes music from Metal Gear Acid, composed by Akihiro Honda, Nobuko Toda and Shuichi Kobori. The second disc contains music from Metal Gear Acid 2, and is composed by Akihiro Honda, Hiroshi Tanabe, Nobuko Toda and Shuichi Kobori. The album comes with an 18-page booklet featuring track listings and artwork by Hiroshi Banno and Junko Kolke.

Track listing

Disc one (58:45)

Disc 2 (67:50)

Metal Gear Solid: Portable Ops Original Soundtrack

Metal Gear Solid: Portable Ops Original Soundtrack is the official soundtrack for Metal Gear Solid: Portable Ops, released for Sony's PlayStation Portable. The soundtrack contains 44 tracks composed by: Akihiro Honda, Kazuma Jinnouchi, Nobuko Toda, Takahiro Izutani, Norihiko Hibino  & Yoshitaka Suzuki. The soundtrack was released on December 20, 2006.

Track listing

Notes

 "Sad Man's Theme" contains the same trumpet from "Peter's Theme" which is featured on Metal Gear Solid 2: Sons of Liberty Soundtrack 2: The Other Side. The trumpet is done by Kenichi Ishii.
 "Evasion" is a remix of "Countdown to Disaster", which is composed by Norihiko Hibino, and is featured on Metal Gear Solid 2: Sons Of Liberty Soundtrack 2: The Other Side.
 "The Legacy" uses a sample of "Ocelot Youth", which is composed by Norihiko Hibino and appears on Metal Gear Solid 3: Snake Eater Original Soundtrack.
 In the booklet, "Substation" (track #28) isn't credited to anyone.
 "Calling to the Night" is featured in Super Smash Bros. Brawl as a song for the Shadow Moses Island stage, Metal Gear Solid 4: Guns of the Patriots as an iPod track and Metal Gear Solid: Peace Walker, which can be played on a "Walkman".

Metal Gear 20th Anniversary: Metal Gear Music Collection

Metal Gear 20th Anniversary: Metal Gear Music Collection is a compilation album released for the video game series Metal Gear on July 18, 2007. The album contains songs from various games in the series, as well as a new song titled "Metal Gear 20 Years History — Past, Present, Future —", a medley spanning the whole series. The album was produced by Norihiko Hibino, who also composed three of the album's songs and co-arranged two tracks.

Game references
Tracks 1 and 11 previously unreleased
Tracks 2 and 3 from Metal Gear Solid 3: Snake Eater
Track 4 from Metal Gear Solid 2: Substance
Tracks 5 and 7 from Metal Gear Solid 2: Sons of Liberty
Track 6 taken from Metal Gear Solid 3: Snake Eater and Metal Gear Solid 2: Sons of Liberty
Track 8 from Metal Gear 2: Solid Snake
Track 9 from Metal Gear Solid: Portable Ops
Track 10 from Metal Gear Solid

Personnel

Performers
Cynthia Harrell – vocals on "Snake Eater"
Carla White – vocals on "Can't Say Goodbye to Yesterday"
Natasha Farrow – vocals on "Calling to the Night"
Aoife Ní Fhearraigh – vocals on "The Best Is Yet to Come"

Music
Norihiko Hibino – production, arrangements on tracks 1 and 5
Yojiro Kudo – executive production
Hideo Kojima – executive production
Takahide Ayuzawa – arrangements on tracks 1 and 8
Shinya Kiyozuka – arrangements on tracks 5 and 11
Mutsuhiko Izumi – arrangements on track 8
Yukie Fuse – mastering
Kazuki Muraoka – supervision

Artwork
Ichiro Kutome – direction, design
Hiroshi Banno – coordination
Akira Kato – photography
Yoji Shinkawa – illustrations

Metal Gear Solid 4: Guns of the Patriots Original Soundtrack

Metal Gear Solid 4: Guns of the Patriots Original Soundtrack is the soundtrack to the video game of the same name, composed primarily by Nobuko Toda, Shuichi Kobori, Kazuma Jinnouchi, and Harry Gregson-Williams. The official soundtrack was released on May 28, 2008 by Konami Digital Entertainment under the catalog number GFCA-98/9. A soundtrack album was also packaged with Metal Gear Solid 4: Guns of the Patriots Limited Edition, but featured fewer songs.

While only fifteen minutes of music from the GEM Impact team (Yoshitaka Suzuki, Takahiro Izutani, and Norihiko Hibino) was featured on the official soundtrack, Norihiko Hibino later confirmed in an interview that the team in fact provided close to 90 minutes of music for the game's cutscenes.

The album packaged with the Limited Edition release of Metal Gear Solid 4: Guns of the Patriots is not the complete soundtrack. It possesses only track numbers 1-3, 5, 9-11, 13, 16, and 19 of CD1 and numbers 1, 10, 12, and 15-17 of CD2 (all of which are songs written by Harry Gregson-Williams), with none of the in-game tracks.

Track listing

CD 1

CD 2

Metal Gear Solid: Peace Walker Original Soundtrack

Metal Gear Solid: Peace Walker Original Soundtrack is the official soundtrack album of Konami's PlayStation Portable video game Metal Gear Solid: Peace Walker, primarily composed by Kojima Productions' Kazuma Jinnouchi and Nobuko Toda, while Akihiro Honda provides the orchestral theme and the theme songs, "Heavens Divide" (performed in English by Donna Burke) and "Koi no Yokushiryoku (Love Deterrence)" (performed in Japanese by Nana Mizuki). GEM Impact's Norihiko Hibino, Yoshitaka Suzuki and Takahiro Izutani as well as Soundelux Design Music Group's Todd Haberman and Jeremy Soule also provide compositions to the soundtrack.

The game also features music from other Metal Gear games, such as Portable Opss "Calling to The Night", which can be played in the game's Walkman. The Carpenters ballad "Sing" is sung by Cindy Asada on a taped recording and by the Boss AI as Peace Walker sinks under Lago Cocibolca.

Metal Gear 25th Anniversary: Metal Gear Music Collection

Metal Gear 25th Anniversary: Metal Gear Music Collection is a compilation album celebrating the 25th anniversary of the Metal Gear franchise, released on August 22, 2012. The album was revealed on KONAMISTYLE, Konami's webstore,  and was released on August 22, 2012 (although it was originally targeting a July 25, 2012 release).

It is similar to a previous album, the Metal Gear 20th Anniversary: Metal Gear Music Collection, in that it collects tracks that span the Metal Gear series. The source games used for this soundtrack were Guns of the Patriots, Metal Gear Online and Peace Walker.

Metal Gear Rising: Revengeance – Vocal Tracks

Metal Gear Rising: Revengeance – Vocal Tracks is the first official soundtrack used in the video game Metal Gear Rising: Revengeance.

The game's score was composed by Jamie Christopherson, with additional music by Graeme Cornies, Brian Pickett, James Chapple, and David Kelly, and directed by Naoto Tanaka. As a result of the game being focused on action rather than stealth like the previous Metal Gear games, the music has a different style. Director Kenji Saito proposed the idea of heavy and fast music featuring lyrics to Kojima Productions. When the studio accepted Saito's idea, the two developers started working together to make the music. Christopherson also contributed by writing thirteen vocal songs which includes electronic music. The soundtrack features vocals by artists including John Bush, Tyson Yen, Free Dominguez, Jason C. Miller and Jimmy Gnecco with contributions by Logan Mader, former member of Machine Head, Electronic Rock Musicians/Remixers The Maniac Agenda, and Ferry Corsten. A soundtrack featuring themes from the game was featured in the limited edition. Another soundtrack, titled Metal Gear Rising Revengeance Vocal Tracks, featuring 29 tracks, was released on February 20, 2013.

The album was released on CD and vinyl, as well as digital services such as iTunes, Google Play, Spotify and Amazon.

Metal Gear Solid V Original Soundtrack

Metal Gear Solid V Original Soundtrack is the official soundtrack for the video games Metal Gear Solid V: Ground Zeroes and The Phantom Pain.

Development 
The soundtrack was produced by Harry Gregson-Williams, making it his fourth Metal Gear title. However, unlike previous titles, his involvement during the composing process was minimal, with him ultimately only composing two tracks for Ground Zeroes. In July 2015, Rika Muranaka told Fragged Nation in an interview that over 30 commissioned songs were never used, thus playing part in Konami's budget concerns over the Metal Gear Solid V project.

In an interview with lead composer Ludvig Forssell, it was revealed that there were over eight different versions of Sins of the Father made just for the trailer, on top of the various previous renditions. Forssell himself provided the vocals during development. The song supposedly is a metaphor not only for The Phantom Pain, but the entire Metal Gear Saga: "For this game we have a couple of keywords: race and revenge, and… unfortunately I cannot at this point tell you everything, but there’s a lot of metaphors in the lyrics that have to do with the game, and the whole Metal Gear Saga, pretty much." Forssell said.

Recording took place in Los Angeles, Nashville and Santa Barbara.

A second volume of the game's score was released exclusively on iTunes on December 24, 2015, titled "Metal Gear Solid V Extended Soundtrack." The album contains over 5 hours and 45 minutes of previously unreleased music. The extended soundtrack also contains music from "Ground Zeroes".

Release 
The album was released on CD, as well as iTunes and Amazon.com. However, because of licensing issues, the soundtracks' licensed songs are missing from the digital versions. Along with it, a separate album titled Metal Gear Vocal Tracks was released on the same day. It featured the tracks  Sins of the Father and Quiet's Theme from The Phantom Pain, as well as various new renditions of tracks from previous games redone in the style of The Phantom Pain. These were done by series veteran Donna Burke.

References

External links

 Metal Gear Solid 4 Guns of the Patriots Original Soundtrack Details
 Metal Gear Solid 4 Soundtrack
 Metal Gear Solid V Original Soundtrack
 

Discography
Video game music discographies